Lola Lafon (born 1974) is a French writer and musician.

She was born in northern France, but grew up in Sofia and Bucharest. She is the author of five novels. Her best known novel The Little Communist Who Never Smiled is based on the life of the champion gymnast Nadia Comăneci.

References

1974 births
French women novelists
Living people
20th-century French writers
20th-century French women writers
21st-century French novelists
21st-century French women writers